Belarus Census may refer to:

Belarus Census (1999)
Belarus Census (2009)
Belarus Census (2019)